The 2014 Florida House of Representatives election took place on November 4, 2014 to elect representatives from all 120 districts. The election coincided with the election of the other house of the Legislature, the Senate.

The Republican Party of Florida won a majority of seats, remaining the majority party, followed by the Florida Democratic Party.

Results

References

Florida House of Representatives
Florida House of Representatives
Florida House of Representatives elections